Novoselytsia is a city in Chernivtsi Raion, Chernivtsi Oblast (province) of Ukraine. It stands at the northern tip of Bessarabia region, on its border with Bukovina. It hosts the administration of Novoselytsia urban hromada, one of the hromadas of Ukraine. Population:

History
From 1775 to 1918, Bukovina was an administrative division of the Habsburg monarchy, and a province of Austria-Hungary (Austrian half). After World War I, Bucovina became part of Romania. In 1940, the northern half of Bucovina was annexed by the Soviet Union.

From 1774 to 1877, Novoselytsia was at the tripoint between the Austrian Empire (Duchy of Bukovina), Principality of Moldavia (later Romania), and the Russian Empire (Bessarabia Governorate). The larger part of the settlement belonged to the Russian Empire and the smaller to the Austro-Hungarian Monarchy. After the secondary customs office in Boiany was closed in 1866, Novoselytsia was the only border point between Russian Bessarabia and Austrian Bukovina. With the inauguration of the train connection between the Russian and the Austrian province in 1893, Novoselytsia was also the fourth train junction between the two Empires.

In January 1989 the population was 8384 people.

In January 2013 the population was 7774 people.

Until 18 July 2020, Novoselytsia served as an administrative center of Novoselytsia Raion. The raion was abolished in July 2020 as part of the administrative reform of Ukraine, which reduced the number of raions of Chernivtsi Oblast to three. The area of Novoselytsia Raion was split between Chernivtsi and Dnistrovskyi Raions, with Novoselytsia being transferred to Chernivtsi Raion.

Natives
Abba P. Lerner, American Russian-born economist. One of the main economists of 20th century. Lead developer of the functional finance concept.
Nicolae Bosie-Codreanu, politician of the Moldavian Democratic Republic.
Ieremia Cecan, Romanian priest and far-right politician.
Tetyana Filonyuk, Ukrainian athlete.

Gallery

References

Cities of district significance in Ukraine
Populated places on the Prut
Bukovina
Khotinsky Uyezd
Hotin County
Ținutul Suceava
Cities in Chernivtsi Oblast